Professor David William Haslam MBBS FRCP (11 May 1962 - 23 Aug 2021) was a general practitioner and physician specialising in obesity medicine at the Centre for Obesity Research at Luton & Dunstable Hospital. He graduated from St. Thomas' Hospital Medical School in 1985.

Haslam was the Chair of the National Obesity Forum. He was also a member of the group Experts in Severe and Complex Obesity. In 2010 he warned that the wrong people were getting bariatric surgery and said some of those who are most obese should just be offered "palliative care" for their obesity.

In December 2013 he was one of a number of doctors who signed a letter to Jeremy Hunt urging that the battle against dementia should focus on the benefits of a Mediterranean diet rather than drugs of dubious efficacy.

Select bibliography

Fat, Gluttony and Sloth: Obesity in Literature, Art and Medicine, by David Haslam and Fiona Haslam (2009). Liverpool University Press. .

The Obesity Epidemic and Its Management: A Textbook for Primary Healthcare Professionals on the Understanding, Management and Treatment of Obesity, by Terry Maguire and David Haslam (2010). Pharmaceutical Press. .

Bariatric Surgery in Clinical Practice [editor and contributor] (2022). Springer Publishing. .

References

External links
 Profile at Bedfordshire and Hertfordshire Postgraduate Medical School

21st-century English medical doctors
British general practitioners
Living people
Year of birth missing (living people)